The 1929–30 Primera División season started 1 December 1929, and finished 30 March 1930. A total of 10 teams contested the league, where Barcelona were the defending champions. As different from the previous season, the last qualified team was directly relegated.

Athletic Bilbao achieved their first title ever after ending the season unbeaten.

Team information

League table

Results

Top scorers

Pichichi Trophy 
Note: This list is the alternative top scorers list provided by newspaper Diario Marca, it differs from the one above which is based on official match reports

References 
La liga top scorers 1929/30

External links 
LFP website
Real Madrid vs Barcelona

1929 1930
1929–30 in Spanish football leagues
Spain